Matthew Warren Higgins(born October 29, 1977) is a Canadian former professional ice hockey centre who played in the National Hockey League (NHL) with the Montreal Canadiens.

Playing career
Higgins was selected 18th overall in the 1996 NHL Entry Draft by the Montreal Canadiens. He played in 57 regular season NHL games throughout the 1997–98 NHL season to the 2000–01 NHL season. He began his hockey career with the Western Hockey League Moose Jaw Warriors in 1993 where he played until he was drafted.

Higgins then played for the American Hockey League Fredericton Canadiens and Quebec Citadelles. He played through two seasons for the Bridgeport Sound Tigers before moving to Europe to play for the Deutsche Eishockey Liga Iserlohn Roosters. He ended his professional career playing two seasons for HDD Olimpija Ljubljana of the Austrian Hockey League (EBEL).

Career statistics

References

External links

1977 births
Bridgeport Sound Tigers players
Canadian ice hockey centres
ERC Ingolstadt players
Fredericton Canadiens players
HDD Olimpija Ljubljana players
Iserlohn Roosters players
Living people
Montreal Canadiens draft picks
Montreal Canadiens players
Moose Jaw Warriors players
National Hockey League first-round draft picks
Quebec Citadelles players
Ice hockey people from Calgary
Canadian expatriate ice hockey players in Slovenia
Canadian expatriate ice hockey players in Germany